Michel Bierlaire (born 1967 in Namur, Belgium) is a Belgian-Swiss applied mathematician specialized in transportation modeling and optimization. He is a professor at EPFL (École Polytechnique Fédérale de Lausanne) and the head of the Transport and Mobility Laboratory.

Career 
Bierlaire received a PhD in mathematics from University of Namur in 1996 for his thesis on "Mathematical models for transportation demand analysis" that was supervised by Philippe Toint. He then joined as a research associate the Intelligent Transportation Systems Program at the Massachusetts Institute of Technology where he worked on the design and development of DynaMIT, a real-time software simulation tool designed to "effectively support the operation of Advanced Traveler Information Systems (ATIS) and Advanced Traffic Management Systems (ATMS)."

In 1998, he joined EPFL first as a senior scientist (Maître d'enseignement et de recherche) at the Operations Research Group at the Institute of Mathematics. In 2006, he was made associate professor at the EPFL's School of Architecture, Civil and Environmental Engineering and became the founding director of the Transport and Mobility Laboratory. Since 2012, he has been a full professor at the EPFL.

At the EPFL, he created in 2010 the Doctoral Program in Civil and Environmental Engineering, that he chaired until 2017. In 2012, Bierlaire founded hEART, the European Association for Research in Transportation that he chaired from 2012 to 2015.

Research 
Bierlaire's research targets at developing mathematical models replicating the complexity of mobility behavior of individuals and goods for all modes of transportation. He aims to develop solutions to transportation problems that also include the implications of mobility on land use, economics, and the environment, among others.

His work focuses on modeling travel behaviors by employing choice and activity-based models; on developing operations research models based on vehicle routing, scheduling, and timetabling; and on the fusion of those models. His further interests encompass intelligent transportation systems and the reproduction of pedestrian flow patterns.

He creates and tests mathematical models and algorithms for applications in operations research that include continuous and discrete optimization, queuing theory, graphs, and simulation. Apart from implementations in transportation demand analysis, his work also finds active use in other domains such as marketing and image analysis.

His multidisciplinary research draws next to mathematics also on computer vision, image analysis, hospital management and marketing.

Biogeme 
Bierlaire is the lead developer of Biogeme, an open source project that performs the maximum likelihood estimation of parametric discrete choice models. It is working within the framework of Pandas, a Python data analysis library.

Teaching 
Bierlaire has developed several online courses, one discrete choice models, and three on optimization. Together with Moshe Ben-Akiva at MIT, Daniel McFadden and Joan Walker, both at University of California, Berkeley, he is offering a course on "Discrete Choice Analysis: Predicting Individual Behavior and Market Demand" that is designed for professionals from academia and industry.

Distinctions 
On invitation from the Association of European Operational Research Societies, Bierlaire initiated the EURO Journal on Transportation and Logistics, whose editor in chief he was between 2011 and 2019. Since 2012, he has been an associate editor of the journal Operations Research. He was an associate editor of the Journal of Choice Modelling since its conception in 2007 until 2017.

Selected works

References

External links 
 
 Website of the Transport and Mobility Laboratory q
 Website of the European Association for Research in Transportation

1967 births
Living people
Massachusetts Institute of Technology alumni
Academic staff of the École Polytechnique Fédérale de Lausanne
People from Namur (city)